Percy John Bird (27 May 1877 – 11 November 1942) was an English cricketer. Bird was a left-handed batsman who bowled slow left-arm orthodox spin.

Bird made a single first-class appearance for Hampshire in 1900 against Somerset.

Bird died in Freshwater Bay, on the Isle of Wight on 11 November 1942.

External links
Percy Bird at Cricinfo
Percy Bird at CricketArchive

1877 births
1942 deaths
Sportspeople from the Isle of Wight
English cricketers
Hampshire cricketers